The Empson River is a stream in the Canterbury Region of New Zealand. It arises near Grey Hill in the Hanmer Range and flows south into the Waiau Uwha River. The name is not official.

See also
List of rivers of New Zealand

References

Land Information New Zealand - Search for Place Names

Hurunui District
Rivers of Canterbury, New Zealand
Rivers of New Zealand